Thulin E may refer to: 
Thulin E (aircraft)
Thulin E (engine)